Volleyball events were contested at the 1966 Central American and Caribbean Games in San Juan, Puerto Rico.

References
 

1966 Central American and Caribbean Games
1966
1966 in volleyball
International volleyball competitions hosted by Puerto Rico